Petr Fousek (born 11 August 1972) is a Czech former professional footballer who played as a midfielder.

Club career
He played mainly for Czech football clubs, as well as for Chunnam Dragons of the South Korean in 2001.

References

Enternal links
 

1972 births
Living people
Czech footballers
FK Teplice players
Bohemians 1905 players
Jeonnam Dragons players
K League 1 players
Association football midfielders
FK Ústí nad Labem players